Or Dasa (born 20 September 1998) is an Israeli professional footballer who plays as a right winger for Hapoel Ramat Gan.

Early life
Dasa was born in Ness Ziona, Israel, to an Ethiopian-Jewish family. His older brother Eli Dasa is a footballer who plays for the Russian club Dynamo Moscow, and vice-captains the senior Israel national team.

Club career

Maccabi Tel Aviv
Dasa then continued to represent the club in the UEFA Youth League before making his league debut on 29 October 2017 in a 5–2 win over Hapoel Acre. Seven days later on 12 November 2017, he scored his first goal for the club, netting the winner in a 1–0 victory over Hapoel Ra'anana.

Loan to Hapoel Ra'anana
In January the following year, Dasa joined Hapoel Ra'anana on loan for the remainder of the season. On 10 February, he received his first-ever red card when he was sent off in a 1–1 draw with Hapoel Haifa.

Career statistics

Club

1 Includes Israel State Cup matches.
2 Includes Toto Cup matches.
3 Includes UEFA Europa League matches.

References

1998 births
Living people
Footballers from Ness Ziona
Israeli footballers
Association football forwards
Maccabi Tel Aviv F.C. players
Hapoel Ra'anana A.F.C. players
Hapoel Kfar Saba F.C. players
F.C. Arouca players
Hapoel Ramat Gan F.C. players
Israeli Premier League players
Primeira Liga players
Liga Leumit players
Israel youth international footballers
Israel under-21 international footballers
Israeli expatriate footballers
Israeli expatriate sportspeople in Portugal
Expatriate footballers in Portugal
Jewish Israeli sportspeople
Israeli people of Ethiopian-Jewish descent